Miklós Dudás may refer to:
 Miklós Dudás (bishop) (1902–1972), Hungarian Greek Catholic bishop
 Miklós Dudás (canoeist) (born 1991), Hungarian sprint canoeist